is a Japanese singer and actor. He is a vocalist of Generations from Exile Tribe and is represented by LDH.

Biography 
Katayose is the only child. He learned to play piano from his grandfather and father. He was a keen soccer player in his youth. He joined the National Training Center to join the team. In February 2010, Katayose participated in the Vocal Audition 2: Yume o Motta Wakamono-tachi e, becoming a finalist. He then joined Osaka's EXPG (Exile Professional Gym) on a scholarship. On 19 July 2011, Katayose became a candidate for Generations and an official member on 17 April 2012. On 21 November 2011, they made a major debut with the single "Brave It Out". He made his acting debut in the drama GTO. Katayose starred in a leading role for the films, My Brother Loves Me Too Much and Ride Your Wave.

On January 1, 2023, Katayose married actress Tao Tsuchiya, and announced that they are expecting their first child together.

Discography

Lyrics

Participating works

Digital singles

Filmography

Television

Web dramas

Film

Game

Advertisements

CM

Other

Live

Awards

Photobook

References

External links

  

21st-century Japanese singers
1994 births
21st-century Japanese male actors
Japanese male dancers
LDH (company) artists
Living people
Musicians from Osaka Prefecture
People from Yao, Osaka
21st-century Japanese male singers